The Airo 1 is a United Arab Emirates ultralight and light-sport aircraft produced by Airo Aviation of the Ras Al Khaimah Free Trade Zone. The aircraft is supplied as a complete ready-to-fly-aircraft.

Design and development
The aircraft is a licensed development of the Italian Euro Ala JetFox and was designed to comply with the Fédération Aéronautique Internationale microlight rules and also the US light-sport aircraft rules. It features a strut-braced high-wing, a two-seats-in-side-by-side configuration enclosed cockpit, fixed tricycle landing gear and a single engine in tractor configuration. The company claims it was accepted as a US LSA in 2008 but it did not appear on the official Federal Aviation Administration 2016 list of S-LSAs.

The aircraft is made from bolted-together aluminum tubing, with its flying surfaces covered in doped aircraft fabric. Its  span wing employs V-struts and jury struts. Standard engines available are the  Rotax 912UL and the  Rotax 912ULS four-stroke powerplants. The engine is mounted on the main keel tube that runs from the tail to the engine, mounting the engine above the cockpit.

Specifications (Airo 1)

References

External links

Company website archives on Archive.org

2000s Emirati ultralight aircraft
Light-sport aircraft
Single-engined tractor aircraft
Airo Aviation aircraft